Eurydema is a genus of shield bug in the family Pentatomidae.

Species 
(following )

Subgenus Eurydema Laporte de Castelnau, 1833
 Eurydema eckerleini Josifov, 1961
 Eurydema gebleri Kolenati, 1846
 Eurydema herbacea (Herrich-Schaeffer, 1833)
 Eurydema laticollis Horváth, 1901
 Eurydema lundbladi Lindberg, 1960
 Eurydema nigriceps Reuter, 1844
 Eurydema oleracea (Linnaeus, 1758) – Cabbage Bug
 Eurydema ornata (Linnaeus, 1758)
 Eurydema putoni (Jakovlev, 1877)
 Eurydema sea Baena, Péricart & De la Rosa, 2004
 Eurydema syriaca Kirkaldy, 1909
 Eurydema wilkinsi Distant, 1879

Subgenus Horvatheurydema Dupuis, 1951
 Eurydema caligata Horváth, 1901
 Eurydema fieberi Schummel in Fieber, 1837
 Eurydema rotundicollis (Dohrn, 1860)
 Eurydema rugulosa (Dohrn, 1860)

Subgenus Rubrodorsalium Stichel, 1944
 Eurydema blanda Horváth, 1903
 Eurydema dominulus (Scopoli, 1763)
 Eurydema cyanea (Fieber, 1864)
 Eurydema liturifera (Walker, 1867)
 Eurydema maracandica Oshanin, 1871
 Eurydema montana Kerzhner
 Eurydema mrugowskyi Stichel, 1944
 Eurydema nana Fuente, 1971
 Eurydema pulchra (Westwood, 1837)
 Eurydema spectabilis Horváth, 1882
 Eurydema ventralis Kolenati, 1846

Unplaced to subgenus
 Eurydema alpina Ling, 1989
 Eurydema leucogaster Kiritshenko, 1963
 Eurydema lingi Rider, Zheng & Kerzhner, 2002
 Eurydema persica Lindberg, 1938
 Eurydema pulchrigena Kiritshenko, 1925
 Eurydema rugosa Motschulsky, 1861

References 

Strachiini
Pentatomidae genera